Donnelly is a village in northern Alberta, Canada within the Municipal District of Smoky River No. 130.

History 
In 1912, a group of 14 settlers from Grouard arrived in the Donnelly area.  Marie-Anne Leblanc Gravel was first homesteader.

The community was named after one Mr. Donnelly, a railroad employee.

Demographics 

In the 2016 Census of Population conducted by Statistics Canada, the Village of Donnelly recorded a population of 342 living in 150 of its 170 total private dwellings, a  change from its 2011 population of 305.

Transportation 
Donnelly is served by the Donnelly Airport .

See also 
List of communities in Alberta
List of villages in Alberta

References

External links 

1956 establishments in Alberta
Villages in Alberta